The Embraer EMB-500 Phenom 100 is a light business jet designed and produced by the Brazilian aircraft manufacturer Embraer.

The project was announced in November 2005. On 26 July 2007, the aircraft made its first flight. It was awarded a type certificate in December 2008, and the first example was delivered the same month.
It has been stretched into the larger Embraer Phenom 300.

The very light jet can transport four to seven passengers, and is powered by two rear-mounted Pratt & Whitney Canada PW600 turbofans.

By the end of 2021, 392 had been delivered.

The Phenom 100 was involved in a single fatal accident in December 2014.

Development

During April 2005, Embraer's board of directors approved the development of very light and light jets. Within ten years, it was hoped that the company could become a major provider for the global business jet market. On 9 November of that year, the company announced at the annual NBAA convention the name of its very light jet, the Phenom 100, and displayed a full-scale mock-up of the aircraft. The company stated that it was actively exploring opportunities for the Phenom 100 to be used as an air taxi. Embraer also opted to increase personnel on its business jet division. That same month, Embraer announced that it has selected Garmin Aviation's G1000 electronic flight instrument system (EFIS) to be installed in the cockpit of its new jet.

In March 2006, Embraer announced it had completed the aircraft's digital definition phase of development. That same month, the company augmented its sales efforts with several full-sized mockups of the Phenom 100. In April of that year, expanded plans for the aircraft's production were revealed along with a 3.5% increase in the unit price. The company reportedly aimed to secure 30% of the global market for very light jets. In May 2006, it was announced at the EBACE conference that 50 orders for the Phenom 100s had been secured. Two months later, Embraer released more details on the pending initial operators for the aircraft. In August 2006, the first order from a customer in Latin America was received.

During October 2006, the American engine manufacturer Pratt & Whitney had commenced testing of the PW617-F turbofan engines intended for the Phenom 100. In March 2007, development of the aircraft was reportedly proceeding to schedule, Embraer took delivery of the first PW617-F engines that same month. In April of that year, the mating between the wing and fuselage of the first aircraft occurred as its assembly neared completion. In June 2007, the prototype was officially rolled out, ground testing of the aircraft commenced shortly thereafter.

On 26 July 2007, the prototype Phenom 100 performed its maiden flight from the company's facility in São José dos Campos, Brazil. Two weeks later, it was transferred to Gaviao Peixoto, where the majority of the flight test programme was conducted. In March 2008, it was announced that serial production of the aircraft would commence in the following month. During flight testing, issues with the aircraft's ice protection system and flaps were uncovered. During December 2008, the Phenom 100 was awarded its type certificate by both Brazil's National Civil Aviation Authority and the United States' Federal Aviation Administration. The aircraft is certified as the EMB-500. The first Phenom 100 delivery took place on 24 December 2008.

Design

The Embraer Phenom 100 is a low wing cantilever monoplane with a T-tail and a retractable tricycle landing gear. It has an oval fuselage with a 7.985 m³ (282 ft³) passenger cabin, a 1.47 m-high by 0.74 m-wide (4.5'x2.1') door and 1.2'x1' windows. Its unpressurized cargo hold is 1.56 m³ (54.9ft³).
Its structural life is 28,000 flight cycles or 35,000 hours, and it is built of 20% composite materials. The Phenom 100 has capacity for four passengers in its normal configuration, however, it can carry up to seven passengers with a single crew, with an optional side-facing seat and belted toilet. The cabin interior is designed by BMW DesignworksUSA.

The aircraft is powered by a pair of rear-mounted Pratt & Whitney Canada PW617-F turbofan engines, each rated to generate a takeoff thrust of 7.2 kN (1,695 lb) at ISA+10 °C. These engines have dual full authority digital engine controls (FADEC). In the event of a single engine failure during takeoff, an automatic performance reserve (APR) function augments engine output to 1,777 lb. Later model PW 617 F-E models have a ten-minute thrust rating at 1,820 lb. To reduce operator costs, condition-based maintenance practices have been explored in addition to traditional scheduled routines.

Variants

Embraer designation.
Phenom 100
Initial production variant, marketing name for the EMB-500 with G1000 Avionics and two PW617F-E engines.
Phenom 100E
Updated variant including multifunction spoilers. Marketing name for the EMB-500 with G1000 avionics and PW617F-E engines and spoiler panels.
Phenom 100EV Evolution 
 Weight savings and thrust increase from 1,695lb to 1,730lb shortening time to climb to 41,000ft from 33min to 25min and reducing takeoff distance at high-altitude and high-temperature airports from 6,609ft to 5,663ft, Garmin G3000 touch-screen flightdeck at a $4.495 million list price. It was first delivered on 31 March 2017. Marketing name for the EMB-500 with G3000 avionics and PW617F1-E engines. 

U-100
Brazilian military designation for two Phenom 100EVs.

Phenom T1
United Kingdom military designation for Phenom 100s operated by the Royal Air Force.

Operators

The Phenom 100 has been operated by a variety of different users, including private individuals, companies, fractionals, charter operators, aircraft management companies, and military operators.

Its 2009 price was US$3.6 million, and US$4.495 million in 2022. A Phenom 100 may cost around /mile to operate.

Civilian

 Emirates - five Phenom 100EV aircraft for cadet training.

Military

 Brazilian Air Force – two aircraft delivered in October 2019 and designated U-100.

 Pakistan Air Force – four aircraft for transporting VIPs.

 Royal Air Force – Operated as part of the UK Military Flying Training System. On 2 February 2016 the UK Ministry of Defence signed a contract KBR-Elbit Systems for the procurement and support of five Embraer Phenom 100 jets to train Royal Air Force and Royal Navy air crew until 2033.

State
The Texas Department of Transportation operates a fleet of four.

Aircraft deliveries

Embraer was originally planning to deliver 15 Phenom 100s during 2008 and 120–150 aircraft in 2009, however, the company would actually deliver only two aircraft in 2008 and had to reduce its 2009 plan to 97 aircraft. By late 2014, Embraer reportedly had roughly 30 orders outstanding for the aircraft.

In mid-2008, it was announced that a new Phenom assembly line would be established in Melbourne, Florida to serve the North American market. It was subsequently announced that all final assembly work would be transferred to the Florida facility from July 2016; it is reportedly capable of assembling up to 96 Phenoms and 72 Embraer Legacy 450/Embraer Legacy 500 annually. More than 170 Phenom jets have been produced at the site until June 2016, mainly for the US market. The company had two production lines for the Phenom 100EV, the other in Brazil. By November 2016, Brazilian production was on trace to be entirely replaced by the Melbourne line.

Incidents and accidents
The Phenom 100 was involved in nine hull losses, including a single fatal accident.

On 8 December 2014, a Phenom 100 with tail number N100EQ crashed into a suburban home in Gaithersburg, Maryland, while on approach to runway at Montgomery County Airpark. Six people were killed; all three on board the plane, and three more in the home on the ground. The National Transportation Safety Board (NTSB) report said "had the ice protection been activated the pilot would have received an aural warning of impending stall about 20 seconds earlier." The NTSB report stated "Safety issues relate to the need for a system that provides automatic alerting when ice protection systems should be activated on turbofan airplanes that require a type rating and are certified for single-pilot operations and flight in icing conditions, such as the EMB-500; and the need for training for pilots of these airplanes beyond what is required to pass a check ride".

Specifications (Phenom 100EV)

See also

References

External links

 
 
 

2000s Brazilian business aircraft
Phenom 100
Very light jets
T-tail aircraft
Low-wing aircraft
Aircraft first flown in 2007